Krivčevo is a small dispersed settlement in the Municipality of Kamnik in the Upper Carniola region of Slovenia.

References

External links
Krivčevo on Geopedia

Populated places in the Municipality of Kamnik